Oak Grove is an unincorporated community and census-designated place (CDP) in Moreland Township, Pope County, Arkansas, United States. It was first listed as a CDP in the 2020 census with a population of 177.

Demographics

2020 census

Note: the US Census treats Hispanic/Latino as an ethnic category. This table excludes Latinos from the racial categories and assigns them to a separate category. Hispanics/Latinos can be of any race.

Education
It is in the Atkins School District, which operates Atkins High School.

References

Unincorporated communities in Pope County, Arkansas
Unincorporated communities in Arkansas
Census-designated places in Arkansas
Census-designated places in Pope County, Arkansas